The Representation of the People Act 1990 (RPA 1990) added a minor amendment to previous Acts.  The act allowed a person no longer resident at their qualifying address or at any other address in the same area to be eligible for an absentee vote for an indefinite period at Parliamentary elections in the United Kingdom and local government elections in Great Britain. Those who still lived in the same parliamentary constituency in Greater London or the former metropolitan counties, the same electoral division of a non-metropolitan English county, Scotland or Wales, or the same ward in Northern Ireland.

See also 

 Reform Acts
 Representation of the People Act

External links
http://www.opsi.gov.uk/acts/acts1990/Ukpga_19900032_en_1.htm

United Kingdom Acts of Parliament 1990
Representation of the People Acts